Bebearia dallastai, Dall'Asta's forester, is a butterfly in the family Nymphalidae. It is found in eastern Ivory Coast. The habitat consists of mainly forests.

References

Butterflies described in 1994
dallastai
Endemic fauna of Ivory Coast
Butterflies of Africa